Yvonne Seifert (born 27 July 1964) is a German freestyle skier. She competed in the women's moguls event at the 1992 Winter Olympics.

References

External links
 

1964 births
Living people
German female freestyle skiers
Olympic freestyle skiers of Germany
Freestyle skiers at the 1992 Winter Olympics
Skiers from Munich
20th-century German women